Andover is a civil parish in Victoria County, New Brunswick, Canada.

For governance purposes it was divided between the villages of Aroostook and Perth-Andover and the local service district of the parish of Andover, all of which are members of the Western Valley Regional Service Commission (WVRSC).

Origin of name
Historian William F. Ganong related that the local explanation was that it was named by a Mr. Sisson, who came from Andover, England.

History
Andover was erected in 1833 in Carleton County from Kent Parish. The parish extended to above Grand Falls, New Brunswick, taking in most of Grand Falls Parish.

In 1850 the parish was extended north to where the Saint John River crosses the international boundary.

In 1853 all of Andover north of the Aroostook River was included in the newly erected Grand Falls Parish.

Boundaries
Andover Parish is bounded:

 on the north by the Aroostook River;
 on the east by the Saint John River;
 on the south by the River de Chute, which forms the Victoria County line;
 on the west by the American border.

Communities
Communities at least partly within the parish. bold indicates an incorporated municipality

  Aroostook
 Bairdsville
 Beaconsfield
 Blue Hill
  Carlingford
 Dover Hill
 Good Corner
 Hillandale
 Perth-Andover
 River de Chute
  Tinker
 Turner Settlement

Bodies of water
Bodies of water at least partly within the parish.

 Aroostook River
 River de Chute
 Saint John River
 Bishop Lake
 Blind Lake
 Tomlinson Lake

Other notable places
Parks, historic sites, and other noteworthy places at least partly within the parish.
 Demerchant Brook Protected Natural Area
 Tinker Dam

Demographics
Parish population totals do not include the former incorporated villages of Aroostook and portion within Perth-Andover. Revised census figures based on the 2023 local governance reforms have not been released.

Population
Population trend

Language
Mother tongue (2016)

See also
List of parishes in New Brunswick

Notes

References

External links
 Village of Perth-Andover

Parishes of Victoria County, New Brunswick
Local service districts of Victoria County, New Brunswick